Looking Back is Norwegian singer Tone Damli's first greatest hits album, which was released on 27 April 2012. The album peaked at number 13 on the Norwegian Albums Chart. The album includes songs from her last four albums.

Singles
 "Look Back" was released as the lead single from the album on 29 January 2012. The song peaked to number 8 on the Norwegian Singles Chart.
 "Imagine" was released as the second single from the album on 27 April 2012. The song peaked to number 13 on the Norwegian Singles Chart.
 "Stuck in My Head" was released as the third  single from the album on 27 April 2011. The song peaked to number 2 on the Norwegian Singles Chart.

Track listing
 "Look Back" - 3:59
 "Butterflies" - 3:00
 "Stuck In My Head" - 3:19
 "Save Me" (feat. Máddji) - 3:53
 "I Know" - 3:54
 "The Bliss Song" - 3:28
 "I Love You" - 3:38
 "Summerlove" - 3:58
 "Imagine" (feat. Eric Saade) - 3:47
 "Crazy Cool" - 3:18
 "Fever" - 3:56
 "Here I Am" - 3:48
 "Young and Foolish" - 4:00
 "No Way Out" - 4:04
 "Ghosts" - 4:15
 "Somewhere Soft to Land" - 4:13

Charts

Release history

References

2012 albums
Tone Damli albums